David Thompson (April 4, 1950 – November 9, 2010) was a Canadian country music singer. Thirteen of Thompson's singles made the RPM Country Tracks charts, including the number one single "I Never Figured on This." In 1984, Thompson became the lead singer of Thunder Road.  His band members included Sean Borton, Darryl Murray, Bob Rogowski, and Boyd Faulconer.

Thompson died on November 9, 2010, in Aylmer, Ontario, at the age of 60.

Discography

Singles

References

2010 deaths
Canadian country singers
Canadian male singers
1950 births